Ľadový štít (translated into English as Ice Peak; , literally, Ice Valley Peak) is the third highest of the Tatra Mountains, in Slovakia, and in the whole  long Carpathian mountain chain, as well as in northern and eastern Central Europe.

History 

The first confirmed ascent was made by 1843 John Ball, Wilhelm Richter, Carl Ritter, a Polish philologist, a Hungarian landscape painter and three Polish mountain guides. In 1843, the first ascent was recorded, via Suchý žlab (Dry Couloir).

Mounteineering 

The most popular climbing routes:

Normal route. As first men on the top. Scale UIAA I.

Ľadový koň (Ice ridge). North ridge from Tery hut to Ľadová priehyba (Ice pass) and on the top. Scale UIAA II.

Grósz route. The left side of southeast wall. Scale UIAA III.

Brnčal pillar. The central southeast wall. Scale UIAA IV.

References

External links 
List of climbing routes od Ľadový štít (Slovak language)
Grósz route on Ľadový štít (Czech language)

Mountains of Slovakia
Tatra Mountains
Mountains of the Western Carpathians
Two-thousanders of Slovakia
Spiš
Cirques of Europe
High Tatras